In chemistry, transferability is the assumption that a chemical property that is associated with an atom or a functional group in a molecule will have a similar (but not identical) value in a variety of different circumstances. Examples of transferable properties include:
Electronegativity
Nucleophilicity
Chemical shifts in NMR spectroscopy
Characteristic frequencies in Infrared spectroscopy
Bond length and bond angle
Bond energy

Transferable properties are distinguished from conserved properties, which are assumed to always have the same value whatever the chemical situation, e.g. standard atomic weight.

References 

Chemical properties